SF-kanalen is a Swedish television channel, which shows movies from the library of Svensk Filmindustri. It is broadcast to Sweden, Norway, Denmark and Finland as a part of the Canal+ package.

The channel launched on 1 October 2009 and would broadcast 24 hours per day from the start. From 1 November 2009, it will broadcast terrestrially in Sweden between 6 a.m. and 6 p.m. on Weekdays and between 6 a.m. and 12 p.m. on Weekends, sharing its channel space with Canal+ Sport 1.

The SF brand had previously been used by a pay channel called SF Succé, which operated between 1989 and 1991.

References

External links

Pan-Nordic television channels
TV4 AB
Television stations in Denmark
Television channels in Norway
Television channels in Sweden
Television channels and stations established in 2009